Marun Al Naqqash (Arabic: مارون النقاش) (1855–1817) was a Sidon-born Maronite who produced the first theatre play texts in Arabic language.

Early life and education
Al Naqqash was born in Sidon on 9 February 1817 into a Maronite family. In 1825 his family moved to Beirut where he studied Arabic language, literature in addition to law and foreign languages, including French, Italian and Turkish. He also involved in poetry, Oriental music and was educated as a bookkeeper.

Career and activities
Following the completion of his studies Al Naqqash began to work as a chief clerk at the customs department and became a member of the chamber of commerce in Beirut. He traveled to Damascus, Aleppo and Egypt for business. In 1846 he went to Italy where he was introduced the Italian theatre and opera. After he returned to Lebanon he translated The Miser, a play by Molière, into Arabic and published it with the title Al-bakhīl in 1847 which was the first Arabic play text. Al-bakhīl was written in the standard Arabic and in verse rather than in prose which made it ready for musical performance.

Al Naqqash also established a theatre near to his Beirut home after granting a permission from the Ottomans where Al-bakhīl was performed in 1847. Then he produced two original plays in 1850 and 1853. The first one was Abu Al Hasan al-Mughaffal aw Harun Al Rashid (Abu Al Hasan the Gullible or the Caliph Harun Al Rashid) which was an adaptation of the One Thousand and One Nights. This second play was also performed at his theatre. His last play was entitled Al Salit al-Hasud (The Impudent and Jealous Young Man) which was also performed.

Personal life and death
His nephew, Salim Al Naqqash, also involved in theatre and formed a theatrical troupe. 

Al Naqqash went to Tarsus on 19 September 1854 for business. While staying there he died of fever on 1 June 1855 at age 38.

References
 

19th-century dramatists and playwrights
1817 births
1855 deaths
Lebanese Maronites
People from Sidon
19th-century Lebanese writers
Writers from Beirut
19th-century translators